iCarly: Music from and Inspired by the Hit TV Show is the soundtrack album of the Nickelodeon television series iCarly, which premiered on September 8, 2007. It debuted on the Billboard 200 at number 28 with 20,000 copies sold in its opening week. A follow up soundtrack called iCarly: iSoundtrack II was released on January 24, 2012.

Songs
"Leave It All to Me", performed by Miranda Cosgrove featuring Drake Bell, was released on December 18, 2007. "Stay My Baby", performed by Miranda Cosgrove, was released as a promotional single on June 5, 2008. It was originally sung by Swedish singer Amy Diamond in 2007. The track "Headphones On" was included on Rock Band.

Track listing

Charts

Weekly charts

Year-end charts

References

External links
 iCarly on Amazon.com

ICarly
Television soundtracks
2008 soundtrack albums